Kato Deftera is a village 11 km south-west of Nicosia in Cyprus.

References

Communities in Nicosia District